Hernando Arrechea Serrano (born 12 December 1946) is a Colombian former hurdler who competed in the 1967 Pan Am Games and the 1968 Summer Olympics.

Achievements

Was a Physical Education teacher in San Antonio High, Guayama, Puerto Rico.

References

1946 births
Living people
Colombian male hurdlers
Olympic athletes of Colombia
Athletes (track and field) at the 1968 Summer Olympics
Pan American Games bronze medalists for Colombia
Pan American Games medalists in athletics (track and field)
Athletes (track and field) at the 1967 Pan American Games
Central American and Caribbean Games gold medalists for Colombia
Competitors at the 1966 Central American and Caribbean Games
Central American and Caribbean Games medalists in athletics
Medalists at the 1967 Pan American Games
20th-century Colombian people